The 2019 Tour of California was a road cycling stage race that took place between 12 and 18 May 2019 in the United States. It was the 14th edition of the Tour of California and the 24th race of the 2019 UCI World Tour.

Teams

UCI WorldTeams

 
 
 
 
 
 
 
 
 
 
 
 

UCI Professional Continental teams

 
 
 
 
 

National teams

 United States

Route

Stages

Stage 1 
12 May 2019 — Sacramento to Sacramento,

Stage 2 
13 May 2019 — Rancho Cordova to South Lake Tahoe,

Stage 3 
14 May 2019 — Stockton to Morgan Hill,

Stage 4 
15 May 2019 — WeatherTech Raceway Laguna Seca to Morro Bay,

Stage 5 
16 May 2019 — Pismo Beach to Ventura,

Stage 6 
17 May 2019 — Ontario to Mount Baldy,

Stage 7 
18 May 2019 — Santa Clarita to Pasadena,

Classification leadership table

Final classification standings

General classification

Points classification

Mountains classification

Young rider classification

Teams classification

References

External links

2019
2019 UCI World Tour
2019 in sports in California
May 2019 sports events in the United States